Jungnickel is a German surname. Notable people with this name include:
Christa Jungnickel (1935–1990), German-American historian of science
Dieter Jungnickel (born 1952), German mathematician
 (born 1944), German actor
Edgar Jungnickel (1914–1992), German U-boat officer
Ingmar Jungnickel, German aerodynamics coach, winner of 2018 USOC Coach of the Year
Isabelle Jungnickel, Austrian politician, deputy director of Innere Stadt
Lars Jungnickel (born 1981), German footballer
 (1881–1965), Austrian artist
 (1890–1945), German novelist and Nazi
 (1868–1934), Social Democratic member of Weimar National Assembly
Ross Jungnickel (1875–1962), American music publisher and arranger
Sascha Jungnickel, programmer of The Oath (video game)